{{DISPLAYTITLE:NZR KB class}}

The NZR KB class of 1939 was a class of six mixed traffic steam locomotives built for New Zealand Railways Department (NZR), that operated on New Zealand's railway network. After the success of the K class, the KB class were built to meet the increasing traffic demands on the Midland Line in the South Island. The locomotives had a wheel arrangement of 4-8-4 and first appeared with distinctive streamlining, mainly to hide their ACFI feedwater systems.

History

Following the success of the K class in the North Island, there was a need for similar locomotives to operate the Midland Line, primarily between Springfield and Arthur's Pass. These new locomotives incorporated a number of improvements upon the K class, including a re-designed plate frame to eliminate cracking issues the K class experienced; roller bearings on all wheels; hydrostatic lubrication throughout; and the inclusion of the ACFI feed-water system that had been pioneered on K 919.  The ACFI equipment's aesthetic appearance had been criticised, hence the KB and contemporary KA classes were both fitted with shrouding to obscure it.

The KB class were technically very similar to the KA class, but were distinguished by the inclusion of a booster engine on the rear axle of the trailing bogie and Nicholson thermic syphons in the firebox. The use of the booster, first proposed for the K class in 1932, was mainly due to steeper gradients and heavy freight trains on the Midland Line, especially Cass bank. Additional piping and sanding equipment for the booster gave the KB a slightly different appearance to the KA. The booster was intended solely for use at low speed, and some class members ultimately had the booster removed due to problems such as jamming in gear, reducing the locomotive's top speed.

Construction of the locomotives commenced in 1939. Construction and assembly took place at NZR's Hillside Workshops. The first of the six-member class was produced before the first of the KA class under construction at Hutt Workshops, in June 1939. All of the class were in service by 1940.

In service

As intended, the KB class were based solely in the South Island and performed most of their work hauling freight trains on the Midland Line. During the Second World War, they were also used on the Main South Line.

While the aesthetic shrouding cleaned up the appearance of the locomotives, it was open at the top and gathered soot and dust which affected the working environment in the cab. After the war, the aesthetic shrouding was removed from the locomotives and the ACFI feed-water system was replaced with exhaust steam injector.

Although the K and KA classes were converted to burn oil at the time, the KB class remained as coal burners due to the availability of high grade West Coast coal.

Withdrawal and disposal

From the mid-1950s, dieselisation impacted the utilisation of the KB class. With the introduction of diesel railcars in the 1950s, the class stopped hauling passenger trains. This became especially pronounced in the 1960s, and the introduction of the DJ class in 1968 brought about their ultimate demise. As they were displaced from duties in the late 1960s, some members were used on the Main South Line, including hauling the South Island Limited.

The first withdrawals were KBs 966 and 969 in October 1967; both were cut up for scrap. KB 969 was withdrawn after hauling the only ever double-headed KB train, having suffered a cracked motion bracket. Before it was sent to the breakers' yard, it was inscribed with a message reading "Goodbye Kb 969, you'll come back as roofing iron".

KB 967 was withdrawn in October 1968. This left only three KB's in service (965, 968 and 970), and of those, only 968 and 970 were still used regularly while 965 was kept as a standby spare locomotive from July 1968 onwards; with the remaining two being withdrawn in March 1969. 970 was scrapped in late March 1968, while 968 made its last journey on 22 June 1969, hauling a railway enthusiast's excursion from Christchurch to Arthur's Pass and return, and 965 was scrapped in late September 1969.

Preservation

NZR donated members of the K and KA classes for preservation, but due to the considerable technical similarities, it chose not to donate a KB. Instead, enthusiasts purchased one at the scrap market rate of NZ$1500 (equal to $22,200 in December 2008 dollars).  KB 968 was supposed to be cut up the week following its last excursion, but a collection on the return journey was sufficient to temporarily save the locomotive. Retired school teacher Cyril Evans raised the rest of the $1500 by showing railway films to Christchurch school children and collecting their donations. The locomotive was then vested into the Ferrymead Trust on behalf of the children of Canterbury and was displayed for a number of decades at the Ferrymead Railway. It is currently under restoration to mainline operating condition at Mainline Steam's Christchurch depot.

References

Citations

Bibliography

External links
 New Zealand Steam Locomotives - KB class
 

Kb class
4-8-4 locomotives
Railway locomotives introduced in 1939
3 ft 6 in gauge locomotives of New Zealand